The Central District of Paveh County is a district (bakhsh) in Paveh County, Kermanshah Province, Iran. At the 2006 census, its population was 34,784, in 8,936 families.  The District has one city: Paveh. The District has two rural districts (dehestan): Howli Rural District and Shamshir Rural District.

References 

Paveh County
Districts of Kermanshah Province